is a Japanese pen manufacturer based in Tokyo, Japan. It produces writing instruments, stationery and jewelry, but is best known for its pens.

It is the largest pen manufacturer in Japan, with competition globally from other pen companies like Japanese Pentel Co., Mitsubishi Pencil Co. (Uni-ball) and American Paper Mate. Pilot has many subsidiaries throughout the world, including in the Philippines, United Kingdom, Indonesia, Malaysia, India, Brazil, South Africa, Germany and France. Most Pilot pens are made in Japan, France and the US. Namiki, Pilot's fountain pens with maki-e lacquering designs, are made in the Hiratsuka factory.

History 
In 1915, Ryōsuke Namiki (並木良輔), a professor from Tokyo Nautical College in Japan, left his job to found a small factory near Tokyo to produce gold pen nibs. In 1916, Namiki expanded his product line and became a full-fledged manufacturer of writing instruments.

The Pilot Pen Corporation was founded by Ryosuke Namiki with Masao Wada (和田正雄) in 1918 under the name of the Namiki Manufacturing Company.

In 1926 it established overseas offices in Malaysia, Singapore, Boston, London and Shanghai. In 1938 the name of the company changed to the Pilot Pen Co., Ltd. It was again renamed in 1950 as the Pilot Ink Company, Ltd. In 1954 a branch was opened in Brazil. From 1972 to 1999 various sub-companies were formed to cover the various branches, and the collective name for these is Pilot Corporation. More recently, Pilot began the BeGreen line—pens and pencils composed of mostly recycled content.

In 1995 and 1996, they raced a Ferrari F40 LM at the 24 Hours Of Le Mans. The racing team that entered the F40 LM was at first named Pilot-Aldix Racing, but was soon named under Pilot Pen Racing and Pilot Racing. It won at the 4 Hours of Anderstorp and finished 12th at Le Mans.

In 2018 Pilot celebrated the company's 100th anniversary with a number of special pages to its website and special edition pens.

Products

Fountain pens 

In 1963, Pilot Corporation introduced the Capless. Unlike other fountain pens during its time, the Pilot Capless featured a fully retractable nib. The Capless was later reintroduced as the Vanishing Point in 1972. In 2012, the company released the Metropolitan (known as Cocoon in Japan), a popular entry-level fountain pen. The Varsity is a disposable fountain pen that is pre-loaded with ink, while the Prera is a smaller pocket pen. Other offerings include the Pilot Falcon, which has a semi-flexible gold nib.

Some of Pilot’s higher-end pens bear the name of "Custom" or "Custom Heritage" and a two or three digit number. "Custom" models are cigar-shaped, while "Custom Heritage" models have flat tops and bottoms. The number is based on the year of introduction (from the foundation of the company—the Custom 74 was introduced in 1992) for models with two digits, while the third digit on models with three digits represents a list price when multiplied by ¥10,000 (the Custom 823 was introduced in 2000 and cost ¥30,000 at the time of introduction).

Inks

Fountain pen
 Iroshizuku (15 ml, 50 ml): 24 kinds of themes of "beautiful scenery of Japan" (3 new colors added to the conventional 21 colors in November 2012). All are bottled inks.
 Bottle ink (30ml, 70ml, 350ml): The color variations are black, blue black, blue and red.
 Cartridge ink (sold in units of 12): Four colours (black, blue black, blue, and red).

Other
 Drawing ink (30ml, 350ml), securities ink (30ml): It is an ink for each application and is used with a pen or brush.

Pens from recycled bottles
Pilot Corporation published some ecological facts about its pens in 2015. The most eco-friendly is the Bottle-2-Pen (B2P) which is made of 90.4% recycled components.  PET plastic from bottles are used for much of it, so it is sometimes nicknamed the 'PetPen' or 'PetBall'.

Others
The brand manufactures and commercialises a wide range of products under its own name and other brands, such as FriXion (erasable ink gel pens), Acroball (hybrid ink ballpoint pens);
Pintor; B2P and Begreen (both, products with recycled components).
 
Sub brands include: 
Better, Rex-Grip, Super Grip G (oil-based ballpoint); Precise, Hi-Tecpoint (rollerballs); Hi-Tec-C, G-2, Juice (or Pop'lol) (gel pens); and Coleto (customizable multi-pen system); Mogulair, Doctor Grip series, Super Grip, Fure Fure (2020) series (mechanical pencils);
Automac (mechanical pencil equipped with automatic function);
S series: S3, S5, S10, S20, S30  (drafting pencils).

The following table contains the Pilot product lines in Asia, Europe, and North and South America, as of December 2019:

Notes

References

External links

  

Fountain pen and ink manufacturers
Manufacturing companies based in Tokyo
Office supply companies of Japan
Pen manufacturers
Japanese stationery
Manufacturing companies established in 1918
Companies listed on the Tokyo Stock Exchange
Japanese brands
Japanese companies established in 1918
Midori-kai